Pavel Bém (born 18 July 1963) is a Czech physician and  politician. Between 28 November 2002 and 30 November 2010 he served as the Mayor of the Capital City of Prague, and re-elected in 2006. On 19 November 2006 he was elected Deputy Leader of the Civic Democratic Party.

Bém studied medicine at the Charles University, specializing in psychiatry and subsequently devoted most of his medical career to the treatment of drug addiction. He served on a government anti-narcotics commission.

A member of the Civic Democratic Party, since 1998 he has been mayor of the 6th district of Prague and since 2002 has become the mayor of the entire city of Prague.

He ran for the leader of his party, but lost.

Bém has many interests besides his political career, including mountain climbing, sea diving, and playing the piano. On 18 May 2007 Bem fulfilled his "childhood dream" of reaching the peak of Mount Everest. On 1 August 2012 he climbed the second highest peak in the world, K2, together with Peter Hamor, and without supplemental oxygen.

In 2007, Bém and his wife received CZK 3,5 million for leaving a rent-controlled apartment from Petr Pudil. Pudil is co-owner of Most-based mining company Czech Coal.

In 2008, Bém ran for leadership of ODS but was defeated by the incumbent leader Mirek Topolánek.

Bém is a close friend of billionaire Roman Janoušek.

References

External links
 Official website (English version also present)
 Civic Democratic Party (in English)
 Civic Democratic Party Prague

1963 births
Living people
Politicians from Prague
Mayors of Prague
Summiters of the Seven Summits
Czech mountain climbers
Civic Democratic Party (Czech Republic) mayors
Charles University alumni
Czech psychiatrists
Members of the Chamber of Deputies of the Czech Republic (2010–2013)